Scrappers Film Group was the prior name of Truth & Documentary, a documentary film production company in Chicago, Illinois.  Founding partners Ben Kolak and Brian Ashby's inaugural film Scrappers won “Best Documentary Feature” and the “Audience Award” at the 2010 Chicago Underground Film Festival. Scrappers Film Group was chosen by NewCity Film in 2016 and 2018 to be among the "50 Chicago Screen Gems." 

Scrappers Film Group produced educational and socially motivated documentary work, including films The Area, Stateville Calling, Accident, MD and web series Central Standard: On Education, Popcorn Politics, and Rights Lab, inspiring audiences to question the familiar and build empathy.  In 2020 Kolak bought the other partners' shares and renamed the company Truth & Documentary. Truth & Documentary owns and maintains Scrappers Film Group's archives and continues to produce video for clients and original work.

Works

References

Documentary film production companies
American companies established in 2013
2013 establishments in Illinois
Companies based in Chicago